Giuseppe Giustacchini (17 January 1900 – 9 December 1974) was an Italian footballer who played as a midfielder. On 6 November 1921, he represented the Italy national football team on the occasion of a friendly match against Switzerland in a 1–1 away draw.

References

1900 births
1974 deaths
Italian footballers
Italy international footballers
Association football midfielders
Inter Milan players
Calcio Foggia 1920 players
Empoli F.C. players